A whisperer is someone who whispers. 

Whisperer or Whisperers may also refer to:

Arts, entertainment, and media

Literature
The Whisperers, a 2007 book by Orlando Figes
The Whisperer (novel), a 2009 fantasy novel by Australian author Fiona McIntosh

Music
"Whisperers", a song by Belgian singer Loïc Nottet for his debut studio album Selfocracy
"The Whisperer" (song), a 2014 song by French DJ and producer David Guetta

Other uses in arts, entertainment, and media
The Whisperer, 1951 American radio program
The Whisperers, 1967 British drama film
The Whisperers, a group of characters introduced in 2015 in the American comic book series The Walking Dead
The Whisperer, a fictional device used in The Mysterious Benedict Society

See also

Ghost whisperer (disambiguation)
The Horse Whisperer (disambiguation)
The Spy Whisperer
 The Whispers